Badarpur is a historic town in South East Delhi district in Delhi.

Badarpur is famous for its Badarpur Border bus terminal. It is also serviced by Badarpur Border station of Delhi Metro on Violet Line. The bus terminal and metro station have been renamed by Delhi Government as 'Badarpur border'. There is another bus terminal from Faridabad Side namely Badarpur border Bus terminal from Haryana roadways and UP parivahan buses and Echo vans goes for Southern Haryana and Western Uttar Pradesh.

It is situated on Mathura Road joining Delhi with Mathura and Agra, on NH 2 (Delhi-Kolkata) National Highway, a part of the historic Grand Trunk Road that once joined Bengal to Kabul. It is the starting point for the on the "Mehrauli- Badarpur Road" that passed through Tughlaqabad, Khanpur, Tigri and Saket towards Mehrauli. The Delhi Faridabad Skyway elevated highway also opened at the starting of Mehrauli- Badarpur Road.

Badarpur is also home to the Badarpur Thermal Power Station (BTPS) of National Thermal Power Corporation (NTPC), opened in 1973 and an important power source to South Delhi, South East Delhi and East Delhi districts.

Overview
Badarpur is located in South East Delhi in Southern Delhi. It is well connected to New and Central Delhi Via Mathura road and Mehrauli and Various parts in Southern Delhi Via MB road. And is Well Connected to both Faridabad in South via Delhi-Faridabad Skyway and Noida via Road 13 A near Sarita Vihar. It is one of the best locality in South Delhi. It was once housed one of many sarais (caravan resthouses), known as Sarai Badarpur, along the historics Grand Trunk Road, probably built during the period of Jahangir in the 16th century. Prior to that, Ghiyas-ud-din Tughlaq built the Qutub-Badarpur Road as he established the fifth historic city of Delhi, Tughlaqabad, in the 13th century AD, which connected the city to the Grand Trunk Road. The road is now known as the Mehrauli-Badarpur Road, an important if congested road connecting Badarpur in southwest Delhi to Mehrauli in south Delhi. The original village of Badarpur lies west of the Meethapur-Kalindi kunj road which passes from Aali village (to the north) down to Meethapur village to the south.

Constituent areas include Molar Band and Molarband Extension. Its surrounding areas include Pul Prahladpur (just south of the Mehrauli-Badarpur road), Lal Kuan (between Tughluqabad and Pul Prahladpur), Tughluqabad Extension, Railway Colony, on the south west; Tuqhluqabad and Okhla Phase 1 on the west; and Saidabad, Madanpur Khadar Village, Ali Extension, and Aali village on the north and north-east; Jaitpur , Meethapur on the east side. Other areas nearby include Jasola, Surajkund and Tughlaqabad, along with smaller blocks to the east of Badarpur such as Anand Vihar, Saraswati Vihar, Ekta Vihar, Harsh Vihar, Shakti Vihar, and Roop Nagar. Upmarket developments include Badarpur main Market . Further east, Madanpur Khadar, a village situated in the river bed of Yamuna, has a population of around 1100 and 560 voters.

Badarpur (Delhi) is not to be confused with Badalpur (Uttar Pradesh) the home village of former Chief Minister Mayawati.

Education
The National Power Training Institute (NPTI) for North India Region under Ministry of Power, Government of India was established at Badarpur in 1974, within the Badarpur Thermal Power Station (BTPS) complex. Kendriya Vidyalaya NTPC and Notre Dame School is also situated with NTPC campus.

Administration

It is part of the Sarita Vihar sub-district (sub-division) of South East Delhi district.

Politics
It is a constituency of the Legislative Assembly of Delhi, part of the South Delhi Lok Sabha, prior to it Badarpur. After the Delhi state assembly elections, Current MLA is Ramvir Singh Bidhuri from BJP.

Transport

Badarpur is situated on National Highway 2 (Mathura Road). Delhi Transport Corporation (DTC) and Cluster buses ply to Badarpur Border bus terminal from Old Delhi Railway Station, New Delhi Railway Station, ISBT and other places.

DTC and Haryana Roadways buses going to Faridabad and Ballabgarh from Inter state Bus Terminal (ISBT) stop at BTPS Complex. DTC and Cluster Buses of Route No. 405A, 405, 415, 418A, 460, 473 & 479 ply to Badarpur, and are usually crowded, even over-crowded in peak hours. Buses are also available from Faridabad, right across the Toll plaza on the Delhi Haryana border.

The Badarpur elevated station of Delhi Metro on the Violet line opened on 14 January 2011, along with two preceding elevated stations, Mohan Estate, and Tughlakabad, which extended the line beyond Sarita Vihar. An extension southwards till Escorts Mujesar in Faridabad was inaugurated by Prime Minister Narendra Modi on 6 September 2015. Metro trains ply alternately to Badarpur (usually from ITO) or to Escorts Mujesar in Faridabad.

The Delhi Faridabad Skyway, a 4.4 km elevated highway, started construction after 2008, and was opened in late 2010. It passed over five important traffic junctions including NTPC, Mehrauli-Badarpur Road, Jaitpur in NCT Delhi and Bypasd Sector 37 and Sarai in Faridabad. Situated at the road junction of Mehrauli-Badarpur Road, which has become increasingly congested over the years, as it lies off highway NH 2 which carries major traffic to important cities of North India.

Within Badarpur, there are autos, usually shared autos, and cycle rickshaws available. Many people in Badarpur also walk to the Metro station or bus stops on the main road.

References 

 Badarpur at Google Maps

External links 
Official Website of NPTI Northern Regional Centre, Badarpur 
 Badarpur at wikimapia

Neighbourhoods in Delhi
South Delhi district